The Romania women's national artistic gymnastics team represents Romania in FIG international competitions.

History
Romania won team competition bronze medals at the 1956 and 1960 Summer Olympics. They found major success in women's gymnastics starting in 1976. At that year's Olympics, Nadia Comăneci made history, leading Romania to the team silver medal, winning the individual all-around gold medal, and becoming the first woman to score a perfect 10. She scored seven 10s during the Games and subsequently became the most famous gymnast in the world. Romania built on that and for years was the second-best country in women's gymnastics, after the Soviet Union. With Comăneci, they also won the gold medal at the 1979 World Championships and the silver medal at the 1980 Summer Olympics.

In the mid to late-1980s, the team was led by future Hall of Famers Ecaterina Szabo and Daniela Silivaș. They won gold at the 1984 Olympics and silver at the 1988 Olympics. Romania then had their greatest period of success in the 1990s. The team featured three Hall of Famers during that decade: Lavinia Miloșovici, Gina Gogean, and Simona Amânar. They won silver at the 1992 Olympics, bronze at the 1996 Olympics, and gold at the 1994, 1995, 1997, and 1999 World Championships. In 2000, they won their second Olympic team gold medal, and Amânar won the individual all-around title.

Romania continued their success into the 2000s and won another Olympic gold in 2004. However, since then, they have not finished higher than third at the Olympics or Worlds. Their run as one of the sport's top countries ended when they did not qualify for the 2016 Olympics team competition.

Overview
At the Olympic Games, Romania has competed in the women's artistic gymnastics team competition 15 times. The team has won 12 medals, including gold medals in 1984, 2000, and 2004. Romania has also won the women's team competition seven times at the World Artistic Gymnastics Championships.

current senior roster

Team competition results

Olympic Games
 1928 — did not participate
 1936 — did not participate
 1948 — did not participate
 1952 — 9th place
Elisabeta Abrudeanu, Teofila Băiașu, Helga Bîrsan, Olga Göllner, Ileana Gyarfaș, Olga Munteanu, Stela Perin, Eveline Slavici
 1956 —  bronze medal
Georgeta Hurmuzachi, Sonia Iovan, Elena Leușteanu, Elena Mărgărit, Elena Săcălici, Emilia Vătășoiu
 1960 —  bronze medal
Atanasia Ionescu, Sonia Iovan, Elena Leușteanu, Elena Mărgărit, Uta Poreceanu, Emilia Vătășoiu
 1964 — 6th place
Elena Ceampelea, Cristina Doboșan, Atanasia Ionescu, Sonia Iovan, Elena Leușteanu, Emilia Vătășoiu
 1968 — did not participate
 1972 — 6th place
Elena Ceampelea, Alina Goreac, Anca Grigoraș, Paula Ioan, Marcela Păunescu, Elisabeta Turcu
 1976 —  silver medal
Nadia Comăneci, Mariana Constantin, Georgeta Gabor, Anca Grigoraș, Gabriela Trușcă, Teodora Ungureanu
 1980 —  silver medal
Nadia Comăneci, Rodica Dunca, Emilia Eberle, Cristina Elena Grigoraș, Melita Ruhn, Dumitrița Turner
 1984 —  gold medal
Lavinia Agache, Laura Cutina, Cristina Elena Grigoraș, Simona Păucă, Mihaela Stănuleț, Ecaterina Szabo
 1988 —  silver medal
Aurelia Dobre, Eugenia Golea, Celestina Popa, Gabriela Potorac, Daniela Silivaș, Camelia Voinea
 1992 —  silver medal
Cristina Bontaș, Gina Gogean, Vanda Hădărean, Lavinia Miloșovici, Maria Neculiță, Mirela Pașca
 1996 —  bronze medal
Simona Amânar, Gina Gogean, Ionela Loaieș, Alexandra Marinescu, Lavinia Miloșovici, Mirela Țugurlan
 2000 —  gold medal
Simona Amânar, Loredana Boboc, Andreea Isărescu, Maria Olaru, Claudia Presăcan, Andreea Răducan
 2004 —  gold medal
Oana Ban, Alexandra Eremia, Cătălina Ponor, Monica Roșu, Nicoleta Daniela Șofronie, Silvia Stroescu
 2008 —  bronze medal
Andreea Acatrinei, Gabriela Drăgoi, Andreea Grigore, Sandra Izbașa, Steliana Nistor, Anamaria Tămârjan
 2012 —  bronze medal
Diana Bulimar, Diana Chelaru, Larisa Iordache, Sandra Izbașa, Cătălina Ponor
 2016 — did not participate
 2020 — did not participate

World Championships
 1934 — did not participate
 1938 — did not participate
 1950 — did not participate
 1954 — 4th place
Teofila Băiașu, Elena Mărgărit, Ileana Gyarfaș, Agneta Hofman, Elena Leușteanu, Eveline Slavici, Anita Țicu, Emilia Vătășoiu
 1958 —  bronze medal
Elena Mărgărit, Atanasia Ionescu, Sonia Iovan, Elena Săcălici, Elena Leușteanu, Emilia Vătășoiu
 1962 — 9th place
Mariana Ilie, Sonia Iovan, Anna Margineanu, Elena Mărgărit, Emilia Vătășoiu, Atanasia Zimresteanu
 1966 — did not participate
 1970 — 5th place
Rodica Apateanu, Elena Ceampelea, Alina Goreac, Paula Ioan, Olga Stefan, Elisabeta Turcu
 1974 — 4th place
Elena Ceampelea, Alina Goreac, Anca Grigoraș, Paula Ioan, Aurelia Dobre, Rodica Sabău
 1978 —  silver medal
Nadia Comăneci, Emilia Eberle, Anca Grigoraș, Marilena Neacșu, Teodora Ungureanu, Marilena Vlădărău
 1979 —  gold medal
Nadia Comăneci, Rodica Dunca, Emilia Eberle, Melita Ruhn, Dumitrița Turner, Marilena Vlădărău
 1981 — 4th place
Lavinia Agache, Rodica Dunca, Emilia Eberle, Cristina Elena Grigoraș, Mihaela Stănuleț, Dumitrița Turner
 1983 —  silver medal
Lavinia Agache, Mirela Barbălată, Laura Cutina, Simona Renciu, Mihaela Stănuleț, Ecaterina Szabo
 1985 —  silver medal
Laura Cutina, Eugenia Golea, Celestina Popa, Daniela Silivaș, Ecaterina Szabo, Camelia Voinea
 1987 —  gold medal
Aurelia Dobre, Eugenia Golea, Celestina Popa, Daniela Silivaș, Ecaterina Szabo, Camelia Voinea
 1989 —  silver medal
Cristina Bontaș, Aurelia Dobre, Lăcrămioara Filip, Eugenia Popa, Gabriela Potorac, Daniela Silivaș
 1991 —  bronze medal
Cristina Bontaș, Vanda Hădărean, Lavinia Miloșovici, Maria Neculiță, Mirela Pașca, Eugenia Popa
 1994 —  gold medal
Simona Amânar, Gina Gogean, Nadia Hațegan, Ionela Loaieș, Daniela Mărănducă, Lavinia Miloșovici, Claudia Presăcan
 1995 —  gold medal
Simona Amânar, Andreea Cacovean, Gina Gogean, Nadia Hațegan, Alexandra Marinescu, Lavinia Miloșovici, Claudia Presăcan
 1997 —  gold medal
Simona Amânar, Gina Gogean, Alexandra Marinescu, Claudia Presăcan, Mirela Țugurlan, Corina Ungureanu
 1999 —  gold medal
Simona Amânar, Loredana Boboc, Andreea Isărescu, Maria Olaru, Andreea Răducan, Corina Ungureanu
 2001 —  gold medal
Loredana Boboc, Sabina Cojocar, Carmen Ionescu, Andreea Răducan, Silvia Stroescu, Andreea Ulmeanu
 2003 —  silver medal
Oana Ban, Alexandra Eremia, Florica Leonida, Andreea Munteanu, Cătălina Ponor, Monica Roșu
 2006 — 4th place
Elena Chiric, Daniela Druncea, Sandra Izbașa, Florica Leonida, Steliana Nistor, Loredana Sucar
 2007 —  bronze medal
Daniela Druncea, Andreea Grigore, Sandra Izbașa, Steliana Nistor, Cerasela Pătrașcu, Cătălina Ponor
 2010 — 4th place
Diana Chelaru, Gabriela Drăgoi, Raluca Haidu, Sandra Izbașa, Ana Porgras
 2011 — 4th place
Diana Bulimar, Diana Chelaru, Raluca Haidu, Cătălina Ponor, Ana Porgras, Amelia Racea
 2014 — 4th place
Larisa Iordache, Andreea Munteanu, Anamaria Ocolișan, Ștefania Stănilă, Paula Tudorache, Silvia Zarzu
 2015 — 13th place
Diana Bulimar, Larisa Iordache, Andreea Iridon, Laura Jurca, Silvia Zarzu
 2018 — 13th place
Ioana Crișan, Carmen Ghiciuc, Denisa Golgotă, Maria Holbură, Nica Ivănuș
 2019 — 22nd place
Ioana Crișan, Carmen Ghiciuc, Denisa Golgotă, Maria Holbură

Junior World Championships
 2019 — 4th place
Antonia Duță, Silviana Sfiringu, Ioana Stănciulescu

Most decorated gymnasts
This list includes all Romanian female artistic gymnasts who have won at least four medals at the Olympic Games and the World Artistic Gymnastics Championships combined.

Hall of Famers
Nine national team gymnasts and two national team coaches have been inducted into the International Gymnastics Hall of Fame:

 Nadia Comăneci – 1993
 Béla Károlyi (coach) – 1997
 Ecaterina Szabo – 2000
 Teodora Ungureanu – 2001
 Daniela Silivaș – 2002
 Simona Amânar – 2007
 Octavian Bellu (coach) – 2009
 Lavinia Miloșovici – 2011
 Gina Gogean – 2013
 Aurelia Dobre – 2016
 Andreea Răducan – 2018

See also
 Gymnastics elements named after Romanian gymnasts
 List of Olympic female artistic gymnasts for Romania

References

Gymnastics in Romania
National women's artistic gymnastics teams
Women's national sports teams of Romania